para-Azoxyanisole (PAA) is an organic, aromatic compound. Its chemical formula is C14H14N2O3. In a solid state, it appears as a white powder, but when heated it forms a liquid crystal.  As one of the first known and most readily prepared liquid crystals, PAA has played an important role in the development of liquid crystal displays.

Its liquid crystal range is from 118 °C to 136 °C. The solid to nematic transition is at 118 °C and the nematic to isotropic liquid transition at 136 °C.

References

Azo compounds
Amine oxides
Liquid crystals
Phenol ethers